Eeram is a 2009 Indian Tamil-language supernatural crime thriller film written and directed by Arivazhagan in his directorial debut and produced by S. Shankar. The film stars Aadhi, Nandha, Sindhu Menon, and Saranya Mohan, while Srinath, Lakshmi Ramakrishnan, and Krishna play supporting roles. The music was composed by S. Thaman with cinematography by Manoj Paramahamsa and editing by Kishore Te. The film was a commercial success to positive reviews from the story telling.

The film was mostly shot in Chennai, Srirangam, Trichy, Coimbatore, Hyderabad, Visakhapatnam, and Pondicherry. Filming began in January 2008, and the movie was released on 11 September 2009 to positive reviews and was declared as a blockbuster at the box office. The Telugu dubbed version of the film titled Vaishali released on 27 May 2011 and was commercially successful in Andhra Pradesh.

Plot
The plot opens with water overflowing from an apartment at around 2:00 AM in Block E, which is seen by the apartment watchman. When he goes to stop the water, he witnesses a young woman Ramya (Sindhu Menon) dead and drowning in the water due to asphyxiation. An investigation of her death is done by Assistant Commissioner of Police Vasudevan (Aadhi), who is an honest and upright police officer and also Ramya's former lover. Although circumstantial evidence claims it was a suicide, Vasu doubts that it is not and starts to investigate from another angle.

The investigation reveals that Ramya was having an extramarital affair with an unknown person, and his frequent visits to her flat are confirmed by the neighbors in Ramya's apartment building. However, Vasu is not convinced, sure that there is someone behind Ramya's death and names him Mr. X. He also remembers his love life with Ramya during their college years. Vasu was denied marriage with Ramya by her father Shriraman (Rajashekar) as he was not willing to get his daughter married to a police officer. When Vasu asked her to marry him without the consent of her father, she refused, and they parted ways. Later, Ramya married a rich businessman Balakrishnan (Nandha). From then on, the relationship was entirely cut between Vasu and Ramya. Vasu then became a police officer.

Meanwhile, strange mishaps begin to take place in the apartment where Ramya died. Kalyani Subramanyam (Lakshmi Ramakrishnan), who resides in the flat opposite to Ramya's, dies by electric shock. An ex-army veteran, Thiyagarajan (Boys Rajan), on his travel to Pondicherry, dies when an umbrella tip pierces his neck. The apartment watchman also dies a mysterious death. Vasu connects the deaths to Ramya but does not know how exactly. He finds that water is the common element in all the deaths. He appoints a few assistants to live in various flats of the apartment and inform him if there is any suspicious activity. The assistants point out a young man (Krishna) coming there to meet his girlfriend Deepa. Vasu identifies him as Mr. X and follows him to a theater, but before he can catch him, he sees "Mr. X" banging his head into the restroom mirror. Vasu tries to stop him, but an eerie spirit stops him from saving Mr. X. Vasu then sees human footprints walking on water and understands that it is the work of a supernatural entity.

The color red and water keep appearing together as premonitions and signals to Vasu that a murder is about to take place. He is unable to convince his superiors that the deaths are not accidental. Vasu investigates in the angle of life after death, and finds that a spirit can contact this world in any medium after the death. It may also be through water. Vasu realizes that Ramya's spirit killed everyone. One night, when Ramya's sister Divya (Saranya Mohan) visits Vasu in his house to console him over Ramya's death, the latter's spirit possesses her body and reveals the truth of her life after her separation from Vasu.

Ramya lived happily with Bala but just for a short time. Bala was a person who disliked anything secondhand in his life. He could not digest his wife's past relation with her lover Vasu, and hence started to torture her. Ramya's maidservant complained of Thiyagarajan in another flat as he had been sexually harassing her. Ramya warned Thiyagarajan that if he repeated this, she would inform it to his wife. Ramya also advised Deepa to stop having a boyfriend (Mr. X) as it would spoil her life, and this earned her Deepa's dislike. Ramya's opposite apartment neighbor Kalyani wanted the flat where Ramya lived, for her daughter. Mr. X created an impression that he had come to visit Ramya to Kalyani. She had spun a false story against Ramya, and Thiyagarajan also confirmed it to Bala as revenge. Therefore, Bala killed Ramya and drowned her in the water to make it look like a suicide.

Hence, Ramya's soul killed Kalyani by electric shock; Thiyagarajan by the umbrella tip; the watchman who supported the false statement against Ramya; Mr. X by dashing him in the mirror; and now, she traumatizes Deepa, which leaves the girl mentally unstable, yet she survives. Vasu warns Bala that he will soon catch him with evidence for murdering Ramya. Bala's friend Vignesh (Srinath) misguides him right from the beginning of the film about the women tendency of varieties and also against Ramya. Vicky later gets killed by Bala himself as he threatened to reveal the truth about the murder. Bala is confident that he can be caught only if he confesses to the crime. One midnight, Bala kidnaps Divya and holds her captive in his car showroom. Vasu comes to save Divya but involves himself into a face-to-face combat with Bala. At the fight, Bala initially gains the upper hand, hits Vasu mercilessly with an iron rod on his head, and then stabs Vasu in his stomach with his own machete. Vasu then loses his power and consciousness, but Ramya's blood-thirsty spirit possesses him and gives him the upper hand to knock out Bala. Vasu succeeds in saving Divya, and then Ramya's spirit leaves him.

The very next day, Bala suddenly confesses to his wife's murder, giving Vasu a chance to arrest him. In reality, Ramya's spirit had possessed Bala and made him speak the truth. After the press conference, while Bala is being taken to court, the sky's color begins to appear bizarre, it begins to rain, and petrol is shown to be leaking from the police jeep in which Bala is being taken to court. Vasu sees a red umbrella with water dripping from it. Then the screen fades to black and a jeep crashing sound can be heard, indicating that Bala was killed.

Cast
 Aadhi as ACP Vasudevan IPS (Vasu), an honest police officer and Ramya's ex-lover, the protagonist
 Nandha as Balakrishnan (Bala), Ramya's husband, the main antagonist
 Sindhu Menon as Ramya Balakrishnan (the water ghost)
 Saranya Mohan as Divya Shriraman, Ramya's sister
 Srinath as Vignesh (Vicky), Bala's friend, the secondary antagonist
 Krishna as Mr. X, a name that Vasu gives to the person behind Ramya's death (antagonist)
 Lakshmi Ramakrishnan as Kalyani Subramanyam, an apartment resident (antagonist)
 Boys Rajan as Col. Thiyagarajan, an ex-army veteran and the pervert master
 Rajashekar as Shriraman, Divya and Ramya's father
 Eeram Ram as Vasudevan's collegemate

Production
Filming began in January 2008, after Shankar had completed the shooting of his previous film Shivaji, which starred Rajinikanth in the main lead. Filming finally came to an end in June 2009 and was prepared for a September 2009 release. Aadhi of Mirugam fame was roped as the protagonist, while Nandha of Mounam Pesiyadhe and Urchagam fame was selected as the main antagonist. While Simran to make her comeback as heroine through this film, though actress's demand led Shankar to cast a new face. Soon, Sindhu Menon, who starred  in the Tamil Movies  Youth and Kadal Pookkal, signed for the female lead role.

Box office
The film released in 120 screens worldwide and was a blockbuster at the box office.

Soundtrack

The music was composed by debutant S. Thaman. The audio rights was bagged by Think Music and Sony Music India. The songs were released on 9 August 2009, although the recording took place in 2007. The audio event was attended by M. Sasikumar, Rajinikanth, Allu Arjun, Nandha, and Aadhi Pinisetty. All lyrics were penned by Viveka.

The Telugu-dubbed soundtrack was released in 2011 by Aditya Music, sometime around the dub's release.

Critical reception
Rediff wrote "Debutant director Arivazhagan, who has written and directed the film, has turned out a horror/suspense film that strives to score points on logic, novelty and raciness. The best part is that he actually makes you cling to the edge of the seat most of the time. No mean feat, considering the limitations on mainstream Tamil cinema." Behindwoods wrote " Although paranormal subjects are not something new, the narrative style, technical wizardry and the brilliant camera work give Eeram, the real eerie experience." The Hindu wrote "Arivazhagan must have polished his screenplay over and over again to come up with such a lucid narrative that strongly impacts the viewer. Only wish the attempt doesn’t prove to be a flash in the pan. Because Eeram shows that this young director is worth looking out for."

See also

 List of ghost films
 List of horror films of 2009
 Gothic film – Notable films

References

External links
 

Films shot in Tiruchirappalli
Indian crime thriller films
2009 films
2009 crime thriller films
2000s Tamil-language films
2000s supernatural thriller films
2000s horror thriller films
2000s ghost films
Films scored by Thaman S
Films set in apartment buildings
Films set in Tiruchirappalli
2009 horror films
Indian horror thriller films
Indian ghost films
Indian haunted house films
Indian supernatural thriller films
Indian supernatural horror films
2000s supernatural horror films
Fictional portrayals of the Tamil Nadu Police
Uxoricide in fiction
Indian films about revenge
Films shot in Puducherry
Films set in Puducherry
2009 directorial debut films
Films directed by Arivazhagan Venkatachalam